Sierra Juárez may refer to:
 Sierra de Juárez, Baja California Peninsula, Mexico
 Sierra Juárez, Oaxaca, Mexico